Robert George Lane (January 15, 1882 – November 20, 1940) was a Canadian amateur soccer player who competed in the 1904 Summer Olympics. He was born in Galt, Ontario and died in Winnipeg. In 1904 he was a member of the Galt F.C. team, which won the gold medal in the soccer tournament. He played both matches as a midfielder.

References

External links
Robert Lane's profile at Sports Reference.com

1882 births
1940 deaths
Canadian soccer players
English emigrants to Canada
Association football midfielders
Footballers at the 1904 Summer Olympics
Olympic gold medalists for Canada
Olympic soccer players of Canada
Soccer people from Ontario
Sportspeople from Cambridge, Ontario
Olympic medalists in football
Medalists at the 1904 Summer Olympics
20th-century Canadian people